NGC 3254 is a spiral galaxy in the constellation Leo Minor. It was discovered on March 13, 1785 by the astronomer William Herschel. It is a member of the NGC 3254 Group of galaxies, which is a member of the Leo II Groups, a series of galaxies and galaxy clusters strung out from the right edge of the Virgo Supercluster.

Two supernovae have been detected within NGC 3254: SN 1941B (mag. 15.1), and SN 2019np (Type Ia, mag. 13.0).

Gallery

References

External links 

Leo Minor
3254
Unbarred spiral galaxies
030895